The Cheshire Wildlife Trust (CWT) is a wildlife trust covering the county of Cheshire and parts of the counties of Greater Manchester and Merseyside, England. The trust's chairman is Bill Stothart. It manages 43 nature reserves totalling over 470 hectares, including:

Birch Moss Covert Nature Reserve
Black Firs Wood Nature Reserve
Black Lake Nature Reserve
Black Moss Covert Nature Reserve
Brookheys Covert Nature Reserve
Cleaver Heath Nature Reserve
Cotterill Clough Nature Reserve
Danes Moss Nature Reserve
Dutton Park Farm Nature Reserve
Eastwood Nature Reserve
Gowy Meadows Nature Reserve
Hatch Mere Nature Reserve
Hockenhull Platts Nature Reserve
Hunter's Wood Nature Reserve
Kerridge Hill Nature Reserve
Limekiln Wood Nature Reserve
Marbury Reedbed Nature Reserve
New Ferry Butterfly Park
Swettenham Meadows Nature Reserve
Trentabank Reservoir Nature Reserve
Warburton's Wood Nature Reserve

References

External links

Cheshire Wildlife Trust website

Organisations based in Cheshire
Wildlife Trusts of England
Environment of Cheshire